Copine-6 is a protein that in humans is encoded by the CPNE6 gene.

This gene encodes a brain-specific member of the copine family, which is composed of calcium-dependent membrane-binding proteins. The gene product contains two N-terminal C2 domains, and one von Willebrand factor A domain. It may have a role in synaptic plasticity.

References

External links

Further reading